"Ezy Ryder" is a song written and recorded by American musician Jimi Hendrix.  It is one of the few studio recordings to include both Buddy Miles on drums and Billy Cox on bass, with whom Hendrix recorded the live Band of Gypsys album (1970).

"Ezy Ryder" was first released on The Cry of Love, the 1971 posthumous collection of songs that Hendrix was working on when he died. Since, it has been included on other attempts to present Hendrix's planned fourth studio album, such as Voodoo Soup (1995) and First Rays of the New Rising Sun (1997). Various demo and live recordings have also been released on albums.

Early performances
An early version of "Ezy Ryder" was first recorded, designated with the title "Slow", on February 16, 1969, at Olympic Studios in London.  The basic track for the song was later recorded on December 18, 1969, at the Record Plant Studios in New York City. On the same day, Hendrix, with Cox and Miles, rehearsed the song at Baggy's Studios for the upcoming performances at the Fillmore East. The trio debuted "Ezy Ryder" at the Fillmore East during the first show on December 31, 1969. Later that night, the group played the song during the second show, but they did not perform it during either of the January 1, 1970, shows.

Recording
Back in the studio, "Ezy Ryder" was rehearsed, recorded and mixed a number of times during early 1970.  The first recording session at newly built Electric Lady Studios on June 15 was focused on advancing the studio version.  Steve Winwood and Chris Wood of Traffic recorded backing vocals. Another recording session three days later was also dedicated to "Ezy Ryder", and mixes were produced on August 20 and 22. The mix of August 22 was regarded as the final mix and presented on the opening party for Electric Lady Studios on August 26.

Critical reception
In a song review for AllMusic, Matthew Greenwald described "Ezy Ryder" as:

Lyrically, Greenwald sees it as building on "theme of an outlaw bent of personal freedom" as heard in Hendrix's 1966 song "Stone Free". Other biographers indicate the lyrics to the song may have been inspired by the popular 1969 counter-culture film Easy Rider; the Jimi Hendrix Experience had previously contributed "If 6 Was 9" to the film's soundtrack.

Releases
Studio albums/compilations
The Cry of Love (1971)
Voodoo Soup (1995)
First Rays of the New Rising Sun (1997)

Demos/jams/rehearsals
The Jimi Hendrix Experience (2000) – recorded February 6, 1970
The Baggy's Rehearsal Sessions (2002) – December 18–19, 1969
Hear My Music (2004) – February 14, 1969
Burning Desire (2006) – January 23, 1970

Live
Band of Gypsys 2 (1986) – recorded May 30, 1970
Blue Wild Angel: Live at the Isle of Wight (2002) – August 31, 1970
Live at the Isle of Fehmarn (2005) – September 6, 1970
Freedom: Atlanta Pop Festival (2015) – July 4, 1970
Songs for Groovy Children: The Fillmore East Concerts (2019) – December 31, 1969 (two shows)
Live in Maui (2020) – July 30, 1970 (second set)

Personnel
Group
Jimi Hendrix – vocals, guitars, production
Billy Cox – bass
Buddy Miles – drums, backing vocals
Guest musicians
Steve Winwood – backing vocals
Chris Wood – backing vocals
Juma Sultan – percussion
Additional personnel
Tony Bongiovi – engineering

Notes
Citations

References

Jimi Hendrix songs
1971 songs
Funk rock songs
Songs written by Jimi Hendrix